The 2013 Howard Bison football team represented Howard University in the 2013 NCAA Division I FCS football season. They were led by interim head coach Rayford Petty, who was conducting the season after Gary Harrell took a leave of absence for the 2013 season. Petty was previously head coach at Howard from 2002–2006, compiling a 25–30 record in those 5 seasons. Harrell plans to return for the 2014 season. The Bison played their home games at William H. Greene Stadium. They were a member of the Mid-Eastern Athletic Conference.

Howard entered the season having been picked to finish eighth in the MEAC. Howard entered the season with 3 players having been selected to the MEAC-first team and six players having been selected to the 2nd team.

They finished the season 6–6, 4–4 in MEAC play to finish in a three way tie for fifth place.

Schedule

Source: Schedule 
*Tape Delayed

References

Howard
Howard Bison football seasons
Howard Bison football